Skynd (stylised as SKYND) is an Australian industrial rock band consisting of lead singer, Skynd, and multi-instrumentalist, Father. They have pioneered the genre of true crime music with a grim aesthetic and songs largely based on disturbing deaths and murders. They have released songs about topics such as the death of Elisa Lam, the manslaughter of Conrad Roy, the mass suicide in Jonestown, the Columbine High School massacre, and murderers such as Gary M. Heidnik, Armin Meiwes, Chris Watts, and Katherine Knight.

History 

Skynd is known for her diverse vocal styles – ranging from high pitch to low pitch and often with an inhuman element. Notably, Jonathan Davis of Korn is also a fan of true crime and joined Skynd in her song, "Gary Heidnik". Davis appeared in the music video as well.

Skynd's first headliner performance was at Electrowerkz in 2019 where she dressed in a motley combination of corpse paint and Victorian-styled clothing. Fans were greeted with cups of Kool-Aid as a reference to her song about the Jonestown massacre. 
Shortly after, Skynd was shortlisted as a Heavy Music Awards 2020 Finalist.

Skynd has been interviewed by The Boo Crew on Episode 90 of the Bloody Disgusting podcast, as well as by Ebony Story of Wall of Sound.

Discography

EPs 
 Chapter I (2018)
 Chapter II (2019)

Singles 
 "Columbine" (feat. Bill $Aber) (2020)
 "Michelle Carter" (2021)
 "Chris Watts" (2022)
 "Armin Meiwes" (2022)
 "John Wayne Gacy" (2022)

References

External links   

 
 Skynd on Bandcamp

Industrial rock musical groups
Australian heavy metal musical groups
Australian industrial music groups
Horrorcore groups
Musical groups established in 2017
True crime